Hugh S. Fowler (July 24, 1912 – August 2, 1975) was an American film editor with about 38 feature film credits from 1952 – 1972. He was named after his Grandmother,  Mary Ann Stirling, whose family occupied the Stirling Castle in Scotland for 400 years.  She married William Kirk Fowler of Auchtermuchty, County Fife and they emigrated to the US in 1852.

Fowler spent his virtually his entire editing career at Twentieth Century-Fox.  After spending years helping other film editors, including Louis Loeffler, Barbara McLean, William H. Reynolds and Robert Simpson, Fowler was promoted to film editor full-time in 1952; his first movie as a film editor was Phone Call from a Stranger, released that year and directed by Jean Negulesco.  Although he edited only 38 movies in a 20-year career, all of them Twentieth releases, he edited some of the greatest scenes in the studio's history.  Two of them involved the same actress, Marilyn Monroe: her performance of the song "Diamonds are a Girl's Best Friend" from Gentlemen Prefer Blondes (directed by Howard Hawks - 1953) and her blown-skirt scene in The Seven Year Itch (directed by Billy Wilder-1955).

It was not until eight years after Monroe's death that Fowler won his Oscar, for the movie Patton (1970).  His final movie, The Life and Times of Judge Roy Bean (1972), was directed by John Huston.  Fowler died in California three years later.  Fowler is remembered for editing primarily Twentieth theatrical releases directed by freelancers, including Howard Hawks (Gentlemen Prefer Blondes), Franklin J. Schaffner (Planet of the Apes (1968), Patton), Frank Tashlin (Will Success Spoil Rock Hunter? (1957)) and Billy Wilder (The Seven Year Itch).

Award
1970 Academy Award for Best Film Editing for Patton
1970 American Cinema Editors Eddie for Patton

References

American film editors
1912 births
1975 deaths
Best Film Editing Academy Award winners